Piz Chaschauna (also known as Piz Casana) is a mountain of the Livigno Alps, located on the border between Italy and Switzerland. The northern side of the mountain (Graubünden) is part of the Swiss National Park. The eastern side of the mountain (Lombardy) is part of the Stelvio National Park.

References

External links
 Piz Chaschauna on Hikr

Mountains of the Alps
Mountains of Graubünden
Mountains of Lombardy
Alpine three-thousanders
Italy–Switzerland border
International mountains of Europe
Mountains of Switzerland
Pontresina